was the 33rd Taiga drama to be broadcast on the NHK network in Japan. It premiered on 3 April 1994 and its finale aired on 25 December of the same year.

Plot
The story takes place during the Muromachi period of Japan, in the midst of the Ōnin War. The main character in the series is Hino Tomiko, a historical figure with a bad reputation because of her actions to rebuild Kyoto after the Ōnin War.

Cast
Hino and Ashikaga
Hino Tomiko: Yoshiko Mita
Young Tomiko: Takako Matsu
Ashikaga Yoshimasa: Ichikawa Danjūrō XII
Young Yoshimasa: Ichikawa Shinnosuke VII
Hino Shigeko: Machiko Kyō
Hino Katsumitsu: Masao Kusakari
Hino Mitsuko: Yoshie Taira
Ashikaga Yoshimi: Shirō Sano
Takao Osawa: Ashikaga Yoshiki

Hosokawa
Hosokawa Katsumoto: Nomura Mansai

Yamana
Yamana Sōzen: Yorozuya Kinnosuke

Imperial Court
Emperor Go-Hanazono: Shun Ōide
Ichijō Kaneyoshi: Taketoshi Naito
Nijō Mochimichi: Yū Fujiki

Others
Junkichi Orimoto: Zenami
Ōuchi Masahiro: Hiroshi Fujioka
Ikkyū: Eiji Okuda
Ibuki Saburō Nobutsuna: Kōji Yakusho
Shuten-dōji: Matsumoto Kōshirō IX
Kenke Uehara: Kotaro Tanaka
Aka Oni: Strong Kongo

Ratings
The series, which only managed a 14.1% audience share during its run, had the notorious reputation of being the lowest-rated Taiga drama series in the franchise's history until it was surpassed by Taira no Kiyomori in 2012. Many blame the dark premises, the mysteries surrounding Hino Tomiko's family history, confusing disputes between her and Ashikaga Yoshimasa, and befuddling love scenes as the reasons why the drama failed.

References

Taiga drama
1994 Japanese television series debuts
1994 Japanese television series endings
Television series set in the 15th century